Burevestnik Glacier is the 4.2 km long and 3.5 km wide glacier on Pasteur Peninsula, Brabant Island in the Palmer Archipelago, Antarctica, situated east of Podayva Glacier and north of Lister Glacier.  It drains the north slopes of Stribog Mountains, flows northeastwards and enters the sea east of Marinka Point and northwest of Levenov Point.

The glacier is named after the Bulgarian ocean fishing trawler Burevestnik of the company Ocean Fisheries – Burgas, which operated under Captain Nikola Levenov in Antarctic waters off Kerguelen Islands from December 1974 to February 1975.

Location
British mapping in 1980 and 2008.

See also
 List of glaciers in the Antarctic
 Glaciology

Maps
 Antarctic Digital Database (ADD). Scale 1:250000 topographic map of Antarctica. Scientific Committee on Antarctic Research (SCAR). Since 1993, regularly upgraded and updated.
British Antarctic Territory. Scale 1:200000 topographic map. DOS 610 Series, Sheet W 64 62. Directorate of Overseas Surveys, Tolworth, UK, 1980.
Brabant Island to Argentine Islands. Scale 1:250000 topographic map. British Antarctic Survey, 2008.

References
 Bulgarian Antarctic Gazetteer. Antarctic Place-names Commission. (details in Bulgarian, basic data in English)
 Burevestnik Glacier. SCAR Composite Antarctic Gazetteer.

External links
 Burevestnik Glacier. Copernix satellite image

Glaciers of the Palmer Archipelago
Ocean Fisheries – Burgas Co
Bulgaria and the Antarctic
Brabant Island